The 1970 European Karate Championships, the 5th edition, was held in Hamburg, Germany from May 5 to 7, 1970.

Medalists

Medal table

References

1970
International sports competitions hosted by Germany
European Karate Championships
European championships in 1970
Sports competitions in Hamburg
1970s in Hamburg
Karate competitions in Germany
May 1970 sports events in Europe